Attitude is the fifth studio album by the Norwegian thrash metal band Susperia.

Track listing

Personnel 

 Athera – vocals
 Cyrus – guitar
 Elvorn – guitar
 Memnock – bass
 Tjodalv – drums

Production 
 Arranged by Susperia
 Produced by Susperia and Marius Strand
 Recorded and engineered by Marius Strand and Cyrus
 Mixed by Henrik Udd and Fredrik Nordstrom
 Mastered by Tim Turan

Release history

References 

2009 albums
Susperia albums